The Inbetweeners is a British coming-of-age television teen sitcom, which originally aired on E4 from 2008 to 2010 and was created and written by Damon Beesley and Iain Morris. The series follows the misadventures of suburban teenager William McKenzie (Simon Bird) and his friends Simon Cooper (Joe Thomas), Neil Sutherland (Blake Harrison) and Jay Cartwright (James Buckley) at the fictional Rudge Park Comprehensive. The programme involves situations of school life, uncaring school staff, friendship, male bonding, lad culture and adolescent sexuality.

The programme was nominated for Best Situation Comedy at BAFTA twice, in 2009 and 2010. At the British Academy Television Awards 2010, it won the Audience Award, the only category voted for by the public. In the 2011 British Comedy Awards, the programme also won the award for Outstanding Contribution to British Comedy.

The Inbetweeners Movie was released on 17 August 2011 to box office success, and a sequel followed on 6 August 2014. An American version was broadcast on MTV, but was quickly axed after low ratings and poor critical reception.

History
Damon Beesley and Iain Morris met as producers on Channel 4's The 11 O'Clock Show. Following posts as commissioners at Channel 4, where Morris shepherded Peep Show, the two launched their own company, Bwark Productions, in 2004 and landed their first series with The Inbetweeners. A pilot for the programme was produced in 2006 under the direction of James Bobin titled "Baggy Trousers".

E4 originally aired the first series in May 2008, and Channel 4 also broadcast it in November that year. The second series began screening in the UK on 2 April 2009 and finished on 7 May 2009. A third series was commissioned by E4, commencing on 13 September 2010 and ending on 18 October 2010. The first episode of the third series had the highest-ever audience for an E4 original commission. Following the conclusion of the third series, the cast and crew of the programme indicated that there would be no fourth series as the programme had run its course, but that an Inbetweeners movie would be produced, set some time after the third series and following the cast on a holiday in Malia, Crete, Greece.

For Red Nose Day 2011, the stars of the programme travelled around the UK in the yellow Fiat Cinquecento Hawaii featured in the programme in a special named The Inbetweeners: Rude Road Trip. The aim was to try to find the 50 rudest place names in the country.

In November 2018, it was announced that a special retrospective programme featuring the cast would be aired to mark the 10th anniversary of the programme's first airing in 2008. It was called Fwends Reunited and was broadcast on 1 January 2019; it was poorly received by critics and fans of the series, leading to James Buckley making a public apology.

In June 2020, the content on its YouTube channel was removed, due to the licensing rights changing owners.

Cast

Main cast
The four main characters are seen in every episode as well as the 2011 and 2014 films. They consist of:
 Will McKenzie (Simon Bird) is the programme's central character, with his voiceover narrating each episode. In the first episode, he has been transferred from a private school, following his parents' divorce, to Rudge Park Comprehensive, where he eventually befriends the others. Will is the most intelligent and studious of the group, but despite his sensible nature often gives in to peer pressure to carry out questionable acts and suffers the most humiliation for it.
 For his portrayal as Will, Bird has won the 2008 British Comedy Award for "Best Male Newcomer" and the 2009 British Comedy Award for "Best Actor". He was also nominated for "Best Comedy Performance" at the 2008 Royal Television Society Awards, and "Best Male Performance" in a Comedy Programme at the 2009 BAFTA Awards. The Inbetweeners Movie received mixed reviews from American critics, but Bird's performance was met with praise. Steve Rose praised Bird's performance.
 Simon Cooper (Joe Thomas) is the most cynical and hot-headed of the group, being prone to bouts of hysterical swearing at the slightest provocation; his on-off relationship with Carli propels many of the plots.
Simon is described as the most normal of the group who leaves "fans feeling sorry for him over and over again". 
 Jay Cartwright (James Buckley) is the most immature and arrogant of the boys. He is also the most vulgar and harbours a generally misogynistic outlook. He is obsessed with sex, and is a compulsive liar.
 Buckley was a nominee for the BAFTA for Best Male Performance in a Comedy Role (2011), a nominee for British Comedy Award for best comedy actor  and a nominee for the Royal Television Society for best comedy performance 
 Neil Sutherland (Blake Harrison) is gentle and gullible, and the most sexually experienced member of the group.

Recurring characters
 Carli D'Amato (Emily Head) is Simon's main love interest. She demonstrates a good deal of influence over her peers, including school bullies. Although Carli expresses interest in Simon romantically on a few occasions, she seems aware that he is far more interested in her than she is in him.
Mr Phil Gilbert (Greg Davies) is a comprehensive school teacher and head of the sixth form making him the most prominent member of staff in the series. Misanthropic and authoritarian, he has little interest in his work and treats his pupils with ambivalence or disdain.
 Charlotte Hinchcliffe (Emily Atack) is the most attractive and popular girl in the school. She is very confident and a year above the four boys. Unlike most of the popular girls, Charlotte is kind-hearted and genuinely likes Will and most other classmates. She mentions to Will that she has had "eleven lovers already", and is held in very high regard by the boys.  
 Mark Donovan (Henry Lloyd-Hughes) is Will's nemesis, often picking on him to fulfill his role as the school bully. Like many bullies, Donovan displays the persona of being friendly and patient in front of parents or teachers. However, he occasionally reveals his sensitive side to Will, though threatens him with death if he speaks of it.
 Polly McKenzie (Belinda Stewart-Wilson) is Will's Mum. She is attractive and a principal object of Will's friends' desires, who often crudely mention her sexually. Neil has often asked Will if he can ask her out, with Will always saying no. Aside from her appearance, Polly is kind and mostly understanding of Will's concerns. 
 Pamela Cooper (Robin Weaver) is Simon's Mum. She is caring and supportive to him, but her efforts to help are often met by embarrassment and surliness from Simon.
 Alan Cooper (Martin Trenaman) is Simon's loving and protective Dad, though he often embarrasses him when talking about his sexual adventures with his mother.
 Terry Cartwright (David Schaal) is Jay's Dad. He regularly insults and embarrasses Jay in front of his peers, and does not take him seriously, or his false reports of sexual exploits.
 Kevin Sutherland (Alex Macqueen) is Neil's Dad. He is divorced and is often portrayed as a closeted gay man, which he denies. The boys frequently make fun of Neil because of this.
 Big John (John Seaward) is a fellow student. John is one of the new kids who start school on the same day as Will. He is often referred to as one of the freaks and is often seen as an overweight social outcast whom the boys try to avoid. Nevertheless, during season 1, he comes to the defence of Will, tries to boost Jay's confidence and speaks to him about the frustration of wanting to be noticed.
 Tara Brown (Hannah Tointon) is Simon's girlfriend for half of Series 3. She is mostly ambivalent towards the other three, wanting to spend time with Simon alone. She does try however to set-up Will with her  friend Kerry via a 'double-date' but this does not end well. Her relationship with Simon ends abruptly when she runs into her sister's arms in Warwick, after Simon repeatedly slaps his genitals in front of her.

Episodes

The three series can be viewed in many countries through Netflix or Amazon Prime Video. Channel 4's catch-up service All 4 also carries it in the UK and Ireland, alongside featurettes "Top Ten Inbetweeners Moments" and "Fwends Reunited".

Music
The opening theme tune to The Inbetweeners is an instrumental version of "Gone Up in Flames" by English rock band Morning Runner. The first series also features music by Rachel Stevens, Tellison, Paolo Nutini, The Maccabees, Air Traffic, Calvin Harris, The Ting Tings, Arctic Monkeys, Theaudience, The Fratellis, Vampire Weekend, The Drums, Two Door Cinema Club, Take That, Mystery Jets, Kid British, Phoenix, General Fiasco, Gorillaz, Hot Chip, Belle & Sebastian, Field Music, Jamie T, The Libertines, Rihanna, Oasis, Jack Peñate, Guillemots, The Feeling, Kate Nash, The Wombats, The Jam, The Cure, Lily Allen, Mumm-Ra, Kylie Minogue and Feist. The second series also featured instrumentals of Adele, Supergrass, Biffy Clyro, Passion Pit, Royworld, MGMT, Maxïmo Park, and The Cribs and the third series also featured instrumentals of Ludacris and Mr Understanding by Pete and the Pirates. A full list can be found on the E4 website.
A soundtrack album, The Inbetweeners Soundtrack, was released in 2009.

The music was chosen by the music supervisor and then Xfm DJ, Marsha Shandur.

Reception

Critical reception
The Inbetweeners has received generally positive reviews from television critics. At Metacritic, the first season earned a score of 73 out of 100, based on 7 reviews, indicating "Generally favorable reviews".

Joe McNally, writing for The Independent, commends an "exquisitely accurate dialogue, capturing the feel of adolescence perfectly" and Will Dean of The Guardian comments that the programme "captures the pathetic sixth-form male experience quite splendidly". The series is often contrasted with E4's successful teen drama, Skins; commentators have offered that "The Inbetweeners portrayal of dull suburbia is closer [than Skins] to the drab teen years most of us spent, rather than the decadent time we wished we spent."

Ratings
The first series began on 1 May 2008, with the pilot episode garnering 238,000 viewers. The series averaged 459,000 viewers, with 474,000 viewers watching the series finale. The Inbetweeners received two nominations at the British Comedy Awards; the programme was nominated for "Best New British Television Comedy (Scripted)" and Simon Bird was nominated for "Best Male Comedy Newcomer". Both won their respective categories. The programme was also voted by the British Comedy Guide website as the "Best New British TV Sitcom 2008". It was nominated for "Best Situation Comedy" at the British Academy Television Awards 2009, ultimately losing out to The IT Crowd. It then won the Audience Award at the British Academy Television Awards 2010.

The first episode of series two, which aired on E4 at 10 pm (BST) 2 April 2009, averaged 958,000 viewers, with another 234,000 viewers watching at 11 pm on the time-shift channel E4 +1 meaning it was watched by 1.2 million, the highest audience of 2009 for E4.

Episode one of series three aired on 13 September 2010 on UK digital terrestrial network E4, attracting a record breaking overnight average audience of 2.6m viewers (12.5% audience share) in its 10 pm slot, the highest ever viewing figure for a programme screened on the channel until 2011 when Glee beat the record. For this series, it was moved to Monday instead of Thursday but kept its 10pm slot.

Awards
 Best New TV Comedy, British Comedy Awards 2008
 Best Male Comedy Newcomer (Simon Bird), British Comedy Awards 2008
 Best New British TV Sitcom, The Comedy.co.uk Awards 2008
 Best Comedy Show, TV Quick & TV Choice Awards 2009
 Nominated for Best Situation Comedy, British Academy Television Awards 2009
 Best TV Show, NME Awards 2010
 Best Television Comedy Actor (Simon Bird), British Comedy Awards 2009
 Nominated for Best Male Performance in a Comedy Role (Simon Bird), British Academy Television Awards 2010
 Nominated for Best Situation Comedy, British Academy Television Awards 2010
 YouTube Audience Award, British Academy Television Awards 2010
 Best Situation Comedy, Rose d'Or Awards 2010
 Digital Choice National Television Awards 2011
 British Comedy Academy Outstanding Achievement British Comedy Awards 2011
 Nominated for Best Male Performance in a Comedy Role (James Buckley), British Academy Television Awards 2011
 Best Comedy, 2012 Empire Awards

Worldwide broadcasting
BBC America began airing The Inbetweeners from 25 January 2010. The network aired both of the first two series as a single 12-episode series. The same was done by MTV Latin America.

In 2010, The Inbetweeners started airing in Australia on the Nine Network's digital channel GO!, on Super Channel in Canada, on the comedy channel TV4 Komedi in Sweden, on TV2 in New Zealand, on MTV Latin America. In Israel, yes Next aired the first two series, while the third series airdate is unknown. The three seasons came in 2012 to HOT VOD. In 2011, the series was premiered in Brazil on I.Sat and on 13 August 2013 the Brazilian streaming site "Muu" premiered the British production.

On 28 February 2011, The Inbetweeners started airing in France on MCM.

The Australian channel ABC2 aired the programme from 8 January 2015.

Home media
 Series 1 was released on DVD on 2 June 2008.
 Series 2 was released on DVD on 18 May 2009.
 Series 1–2 boxset was released on DVD on 18 May 2009.
 Series 3 was released on DVD on 25 October 2010.
 Series 1–3 boxset was released on 25 October 2010.
 The Inbetweeners Movie was released on DVD and Blu-ray Disc on 12 December 2011 in the UK.
 The Inbetweeners 2 was released on DVD and Blu-ray on 1 December 2014 in the UK.

All of the DVDs received an 18 certificate in the United Kingdom and MA15+ in Australia due to their high number of strong language, crude humour and strong, frequent, sex references. The theatrical version of The Inbetweeners Movie received a 15 certificate in the United Kingdom, with the extended cut release receiving an 18 certificate.

Subsequent media

Films

In September 2009, Beesley and Morris confirmed that a film had been commissioned by Film4. The plot revolves around the four boys, now eighteen years old, going on holiday to Malia, Greece. It was released in cinemas on 17 August 2011 with a 15 certificate in the UK. The original film was also released in the United States on 7 September 2012, it was very successful. From a budget of £3.5 million, the film made a global box office of over £57 million.

At the beginning of August 2013, creators Iain Morris and Damon Beesley confirmed that a second Inbetweeners film would be made with a planned release date of 6 August 2014 in the UK and Ireland; they released a statement saying "We couldn't be more excited to be making another Inbetweeners movie. A new chapter in the lives of the Inbetweeners feels like the very least we can do to thank the fans for their phenomenal response to the first movie." This sequel is set in Australia.

Books
There have been two books released:
 The Inbetweeners Yearbook was released by Century Books on 29 September 2011. 
 The Inbetweeners Scriptbook was released by Century Books on 25 October 2012.

U.S. version

In 2008, Iain Morris and Damon Beesley were asked by ABC to produce a pilot for a US version of The Inbetweeners. The pilot was not picked up by the network, but they have given Morris and Beesley a second blind script commitment for a future project which the two will create.

On 31 March 2011, it was announced that MTV had ordered a 12-episode first season for a U.S. version of The Inbetweeners. A pilot episode, written by Brad Copeland, was given the green light in September 2010. Copeland also serves as executive producer on the series along with Beesley and Morris. The series ran for one season from 20 August to 5 November 2012, before being cancelled by MTV due to low ratings.

The US version began airing in the UK on 5 December 2012 on E4. A UK DVD release of the US version was released on 8 January 2013. The US version was broadcast on Viacom-owned Freeview channel Viva from 4 August 2014.

Fwends Reunited
On 1 January 2019, Channel 4 broadcast a 10th anniversary special entitled 'Fwends Reunited', hosted by Jimmy Carr. The four lead actors were present alongside supporting cast members; the title is a reference to a joke within the episode Will Gets a Girlfriend.

The special itself was a chat show with multiple segments including a quiz with four fans of the show, a history of the programme's production hosted by Neil Oliver, and awards based on the programme's best characters and moments. The special was met with a mostly negative reception from critics and fans alike; criticism from general viewers was primarily aimed at it being a simple chat show when a number of fans had mistakenly anticipated it as being a one-off special episode.

The Independent noted the "overwhelmingly negative responses" the special received, which included criticism from viewers towards the host Jimmy Carr, viewers claiming the four actors appeared clearly disinterested in the special, while there was also disappointment that they were not given a chance to speak more. Michael Hogan of The Daily Telegraph dubbed it a "shambolic mess that failed to do the show justice", although a more positive review came from Sean O'Grady of The Independent, who considered it "full of nostalgia". The extensive criticism led to James Buckley issuing an apology through Twitter.

References

External links

 
 
 
  -with interview
 BAFTA Interview with The Inbetweeners Cast at Latitude Festival in 2010
 The Inbetweeners music – Scene by Scene listing of all the music played on the Inbetweeners
 – The Top 10 Moments from the First Two Series

 
2008 British television series debuts
2010 British television series endings
2000s British satirical television series
2000s British sex comedy television series
2000s British teen sitcoms
2000s high school television series
2010s British satirical television series
2010s British sex comedy television series
2010s British teen sitcoms
2010s high school television series
British high school television series
Channel 4 sitcoms
Coming-of-age television shows
E4 sitcoms
English-language television shows
Fictional quartets
Television series about bullying
Television series about teenagers
Television series by Banijay
Television shows adapted into films
Television shows adapted into novels
Television shows set in England
Television shows set in London
Virginity in television